The Washington World, or The World, is a free weekly newspaper in Central Vermont and is one of the prominent competitors of the Barre Montpelier Times Argus in the Barre, Vermont micropolitan area.

References

Newspapers published in Vermont
Weekly newspapers published in the United States